"And So It Goes" is a song by Billy Joel.

And So It Goes may also refer to:

Music
And So It Goes (album), by Don Williams, 2012
"And So It Goes" (Nitty Gritty Dirt Band song), 1989
"And So It Goes", a song by Graham Nash from Wild Tales
"And So It Goes", a song by Roberta Flack from Oasis

Other media
And So It Goes (film), a 2014 American film
And So It Goes, an autobiography by Linda Ellerbee

See also
So It Goes (disambiguation)